Nilphamari-4 is a constituency represented in the Jatiya Sangsad (National Parliament) of Bangladesh since 2019 by Ahsan Adelur Rahman of the Jatiya Party (Ershad).

Boundaries 
The constituency encompasses Saidpur and Kishoreganj upazilas.

History 
The constituency was created in 1984 from a Rangpur constituency when the former Rangpur District was split into five districts: Nilphamari, Lalmonirhat, Rangpur, Kurigram, and Gaibandha.

Ahead of the 2018 general election, the Election Commission expanded the boundaries of the constituency. Previously it excluded the three northernmost union parishads of Kishoreganj Upazila: Barabhita, Putimari, and Ranachandi.

Members of Parliament

Elections

Elections in the 2010s 
Shawkat Chowdhury was elected unopposed in the 2014 general election after opposition parties withdrew their candidacies in a boycott of the election.

Elections in the 2000s

Elections in the 1990s

References

External links
 

Parliamentary constituencies in Bangladesh
Nilphamari District